The 1893 North Carolina A&M Aggies football team represented the North Carolina A&M Aggies of North Carolina College of Agriculture and Mechanic Arts during the 1893 college football season.

Schedule

References

North Carolina A&M
NC State Wolfpack football seasons
College football undefeated seasons
North Carolina A&M Aggies football